Through the Looking Glass is the eighth studio album by English rock band Siouxsie and the Banshees. The album is a collection of cover versions. It was co-produced with Mike Hedges and released in March 1987 on Polydor. Through the Looking Glass was preceded by the single "This Wheel's on Fire". It was the second and final album recorded with guitarist John Valentine Carruthers. Some of their cover songs were praised by the original artists themselves.

History
The title of the record, Through the Looking Glass, referred to Lewis Carroll's book  of the same name. The band had already been inspired by Carroll's work when naming their label, Wonderland, which was derived from Alice's Adventures in Wonderland. The record was also an ode to David Bowie's Pin Ups, a covers album recorded in the early 1970s. After spending more than a year working on 1986's Tinderbox, the Banshees wanted spontaneity, and quickly returned to the studio after the tour, to record their own covers album. It was a project they had been considering since recording a version of the Beatles's "Dear Prudence" in 1983.

For the Through the Looking Glass sessions, which took place in September and October 1986, they chose material mainly dating from the first half of the 1970s, from an era preceding the 1976 formation of their band. Most of the songs were from artists who had influenced them: Roxy Music, John Cale, Iggy Pop, the Doors and Kraftwerk. Producer Mike Hedges, who hadn't worked with them since 1984, was called back. The instrumentation was different; for this album, they hired other instrumentalists including a brass section and a harpist. Musician Martin McCarrick, who would become an official member of the Banshees after this album, created string arrangements for several tracks.

The band's version of Iggy Pop song "The Passenger" featured brass arrangements played by Pete Thoms and Luke Tunney, who had already worked with Siouxsie and Budgie on the Creatures' single "Right Now".

Release 
Through the Looking Glass was released on 2 March 1987 on Polydor. A few weeks after, Bowie contacted them to be the special guests at two shows on his Glass Spider Tour in Anaheim.

The album was reissued on CD with bonus tracks in October 2014.

A 180g vinyl reissue of the album, remastered from the original ¼” tapes and cut half-speed at Abbey Road Studios by Miles Showell, was released in August 2018.

Reception and legacy

Ralf Hütter of Kraftwerk lauded the version of "Hall of Mirrors" and stated: "In general, we consider cover versions as an appreciation of our work. The version of 'Hall of Mirrors' by Siouxsie and the Banshees is extraordinary". Iggy Pop said of their cover of "The Passenger": "That's good. She sings it well and she threw a little note in when she sings it, that I wish I had thought of. It kind of improves it [...]. The horn thing is good".

In their contemporary review, LA Times stated: "These songs are superbly rearranged, retaining enough of what was special about the originals and adding just the right new twists." Critic Terry Atkinson wrote about their cover of "Strange Fruit": "Only someone as brash as Siouxsie Sioux would re-record Lewis Allan's "Strange Fruit," a song so strongly identified with Billie Holiday. And only someone as serious and sensitive could bring it off like this. A solemn string section behind the vocals and—best of all—a bridge of New Orleans funeral-march jazz enhance Siouxsie's evocative interpretation".  Atkinson then concluded emphasising, "Such inventive touches permeate a great album". Sounds praised the rendition of "Trust in Me" as "quite astonishing.  Whereas once it was about a python getting ready to crush a little boy to death, now it's a harp-laden lullaby of rampant, swirling eroticism".

In a retrospective review, AllMusic said: "The inspired range of covers reaches from glam-era landmarks (Roxy Music's 'Sea Breezes', John Cale's 'Gun') to Billie Holiday's sorrowful touchstone 'Strange Fruit' to, in one of the best such efforts ever (and a year before Hal Willner's Stay Awake project), a Disney classic—namely the slinky 'Trust in Me', originally from The Jungle Book and given a spare, mostly-Budgie backing that could almost be a sparkling Creatures outtake". Mojo included their version of "Strange Fruit" on the 2007 CD Music Is Love: 15 Tracks That Changed the World Recovered By.... Writing in the 2004 edition of The Rolling Stone Album Guide, Mark Coleman and Mac Randall gave Through the Looking Glass a rating of 2.5 stars out of five, saying that it contains "overpolished covers of the group's obvious influences". In an article about "Records Turning 30 Years Old in 2017", Paste included it in their top fifteen saying that it was, "an eclectic and adventurous album of Siouxsie-fied takes on a diverse collection of songs", with "interesting and engaging choices". Journalist Will Hodge concluded: "this album is a prime example of the value of artistic merit not being accurately measured by mainstream successes".

Track listing

Personnel 
Siouxsie and the Banshees
 Siouxsie Sioux - vocals
 Steven Severin - electric bass and keyboards
 Budgie - drums and percussion
 John Valentine Carruthers - guitars and keyboards

Additional personnel
 Martin McCarrick - cello, keyboards, string arrangements
 Jocelyn Pook - viola
 Gini Ball - violin
 Pete Thoms - trombone
 Luke Tunney - trumpet
 Martin Dobson - saxophone
 Julie Aliss - harp
 Mike Hedges - producer, engineer

Charts

Certifications

References 

Siouxsie and the Banshees albums
1987 albums
Covers albums
Albums produced by Mike Hedges
Polydor Records albums
Geffen Records albums